Prathamesh Gawas (born 10 May 1994) is an Indian cricketer. He made his List A debut for Goa in the 2016–17 Vijay Hazare Trophy on 4 March 2017. He made his Twenty20 debut on 14 November 2019, for Goa in the 2019–20 Syed Mushtaq Ali Trophy.

References

External links
 

1994 births
Living people
Indian cricketers
Goa cricketers
Place of birth missing (living people)